Theodorus Johannes Thijssen (Amsterdam, 16 June 1879 – Amsterdam, 23 December 1943) was a Dutch writer, teacher and socialist politician. He is best known for the book Kees de Jongen.

Biography
Theo Thijssen, the oldest child out of six, grew up in the Amsterdam suburb of Jordaan where his father had a small shoe-shop. His family was not wealthy, and after his father died when he was eight they moved and his mother started a grocery where he and his younger brother had to help to get some income for the family. After a tough entrance exam with a scholarship he was allowed on the Rijkskweekschool voor onderwijzers, a college to become a teacher, in Haarlem. After his study was completed he became teacher from 1898 until 1921 at several schools in Amsterdam.

In 1905 he and college friend Peter Bol founded the magazine De Nieuwe School in which he wrote a lot of articles with criticism about teaching methods, learning books, read books and child books. He also wrote some fragments about a fantasy rich boy Kees, that would later become his most famous novel Kees de Jongen. In this book he enriched the Dutch language with the word "zwembadpas", a quick way of walking that Kees had developed. This word became so legendary that the Theo Thijssen Museum organized the day of the "zwembadpas".

In 1906 he married Johanna Maria Zeegerman, craft teacher, with whom he had one son. After her death in 1908 he remarried in 1909 with Geertje Dade, with whom he had a daughter and two sons.

In 1921 Thijssen became salaried director of the Dutch Association of Teachers. He also became editor from "De Bode" (a magazine about the working conditions of teachers) and "School en huis" (a magazine about education). In the magazine about education he wrote again about Kees and made it a more ongoing story. This would later become the well-known novel Kees de jongen. Although Thijssen always said the story was fiction there are various similarities with his own childhood.

Just like his father Thijssen harboured socialistic sympathies from an early age, although he only became member of the Sociaal Democratische Arbeiders Partij (SDAP), a social party in the Netherlands, in 1912. From 1933 until 1940 he also was member of the House of Representatives of the Netherlands for this party and from 1935 until 1941 member of the Amsterdam city council, also for the SDAP.

In December 1943 he had a series of serious diseases and eventually died from the effects of a stroke.

Legacy 

The literary award Theo Thijssen-prijs is named after him. There are also a number of schools named after him, including the Theo Thijssen school in Amsterdam.

Bibliography
Barend Wels (1908)
Jongensdagen (1909)
Taal en schoolmeester (1911)
Sommenboek voor de volksschool (1912)
Cijfers (1913)
Cijferboek voor de volksschool (1913)
Kees de jongen (1923)
Schoolland (1925)
De gelukkige klas (1926)
Het grijze kind (1927)
De examenidioot of De kinderexamens van 1928 (1929)
Egeltje. Een bundel vrolijk proza (1929)
Het taaie ongrief (1932)
De fatale gaping (1934)
Een bonte bundel (1935)
In de ochtend van het leven (1941)
Wat onze kinderen bedreigt (undated)

References

External links
www.theothijssenschoolamsterdam.nl
www.obstheothijssen.nl
www.theothijssenmuseum.nl
www.iisg.nl
www.dbnl.org
 

1879 births
1943 deaths
20th-century Dutch novelists
20th-century Dutch male writers
Dutch male novelists
Dutch socialists
Dutch political activists
Dutch Esperantists
Members of the House of Representatives (Netherlands)
Social Democratic Workers' Party (Netherlands) politicians
Writers from Amsterdam